10 Seconds is a 2008 German film.

Plot
Four individuals are touched in different routes by a catastrophe. Markus (Wolfram Koch) is an air activity controller who was directing a plane towards an arrival when it crashed into another plane, killing 83 individuals. Months after the fact, Markus feels a devastating blame over his part in the accident. Markus' wife Franziska (Marie Bäumer) found another comfort on another man. In the meantime, Erik (Filip Peeters) is having hard time because the death of his wife and kid in the accident, even as he goes into another relationship with Daniela (Hannah Herzsprung). Meanwhile, Harald (Sebastian Blomberg) is a cop who was sent to the scene of the accident, and the awful scenes have been smoldered into his min. As Markus, Franziska, Erik and Harald struggled in the result of the accident.

Cast
 Marie Bäumer as Franziska Hofer
 Sebastian Blomberg as Harald
 Filip Peeters as Erik
 Hannah Herzsprung as Daniela

External links

References 

German drama films
2000s German-language films
2008 films
2000s German films